Stony Island may refer to:
Kamenny Island, Russia
Stony Island Avenue, Chicago 
Stony Island (film), largely set along Stony Island Avenue
Stony Island Arts Bank, a major nonprofit arts organization located on Stony Island Avenue
, an islet in the Isles of Scilly
Stony Island (Michigan), an island in the Detroit River
Stony Island (Newfoundland and Labrador)
Stony Island (New York)
Stony Island (Western Australia), an islet off the southern shore of Western Australia

See also
Stoney Island, Nova Scotia